"I Feel So Bad" is a song performed by French DJ and record producer Kungs, featuring vocals from Ephemerals. The song was released as a digital download in France on 19 October 2016 as the third single from his debut studio album Layers (2016). The song has peaked at number 3 on the French Singles Chart. The song was written by Kungs and Nicholas Hillman.

Music video
A music video to accompany the release of "I Feel So Bad" was first released onto YouTube on 3 November 2016 at a total length of three minutes and twenty-five seconds.

Track listing

Charts

Weekly charts

Year-end charts

Certifications

Release history

References

2016 songs
2016 singles
Kungs songs
Tropical house songs
Songs written by Kungs